Nemaha County is a county in the U.S. state of Nebraska. As of the 2020 United States Census, the population was 7,074. Its county seat is Auburn.

In the Nebraska license plate system, Nemaha County is represented by the prefix 44 (it had the forty-fourth-largest number of vehicles registered in the county when the license plate system was established in 1922).

History
The county forms the core of the Nemaha Half-Breed Reservation formed in the Fourth Treaty of Prairie du Chien in 1830 as land for the offspring of traders and Native Americans. The grounds of modern Indian Cave State Park mark where the county's first community, Saint Deroin, was founded in 1853 by members of the reservation as a trading post on the Missouri River. When white settlement was permitted in the Kansas–Nebraska Act of 1854, this area was part of Forney County (named for US cabinet member John W. Forney) which stretched along the Little Nemaha River from the Missouri River to west of Lincoln, Nebraska. In 1855 Nemaha County was formally founded with Brownville as its county seat. Johnson County, also founded in 1855, was initially administratively attached to Nemaha, but was organized as a stand-alone county in 1857.

Brownville was the biggest city in Nebraska at the time and several firsts occurred in the county including: in 1861 the first state normal school was founded at what today is Peru State College; Daniel Freeman filed the first claim under the Homestead Act of 1862 for land on January 1, 1863, at the Brownville land office.

The Nebraska State Fair was held in the county at Brownville in 1870–1871.

In 1883 the county seat was moved to Auburn.

In 1974 the Cooper Nuclear Station was commissioned south of Brownville.

Geography
Nemaha County lies on the eastern edge of Nebraska. Its east boundary line abuts the west boundary line of the state of Missouri (across the Missouri River). Most of the county's eastern border follows the Missouri River bordering Atchison County, Missouri. In the county's extreme northeast corner, the border follows the river's former course, lying nearly two miles east of the present-day channel.  This de facto enclave is McKissick Island. The Nemaha River flows southeastward through the upper eastern portion of the county, discharging into the Missouri River below the village of Nemaha.

The county's terrain consists of low rolling hills, sloping eastward to the Missouri River valley. Much of the terrain is devoted to agriculture.

Major highways

  U.S. Highway 75
  U.S. Highway 136
  Nebraska Highway 62
  Nebraska Highway 67
  Nebraska Highway 105

Protected area
 Indian Cave State Park (part)

Adjacent counties

 Otoe County - north
 Atchison County, Missouri - east
 Holt County, Missouri - southeast
 Richardson County - south
 Pawnee County - southwest
 Johnson County - west

Demographics

As of the 2000 United States Census there were 7,576 people, 3,047 households, and 1,980 families in the county. The population density was 18 people per square mile (7/km2). There were 3,439 housing units at an average density of 8 per square mile (3/km2). The racial makeup of the county was 97.60% White, 0.36% Black or African American, 0.30% Native American, 0.59% Asian, 0.04% Pacific Islander, 0.37% from other races, and 0.74% from two or more races. 1.00% of the population were Hispanic or Latino of any race.

There were 3,047 households, out of which 29.50% had children under the age of 18 living with them, 55.00% were married couples living together, 7.20% had a female householder with no husband present, and 35.00% were non-families. 30.50% of all households were made up of individuals, and 16.20% had someone living alone who was 65 years of age or older. The average household size was 2.32 and the average family size was 2.91.

The county population contained 23.20% under the age of 18, 11.90% from 18 to 24, 23.90% from 25 to 44, 22.70% from 45 to 64, and 18.40% who were 65 years of age or older. The median age was 39 years. For every 100 females there were 93.30 males. For every 100 females age 18 and over, there were 92.00 males.

The median income for a household in the county was $32,588, and the median income for a family was $43,780. Males had a median income of $30,956 versus $19,263 for females. The per capita income for the county was $17,004. About 8.30% of families and 12.60% of the population were below the poverty line, including 13.20% of those under age 18 and 13.50% of those age 65 or over.

Communities

Cities
 Auburn (county seat)
 Peru

Villages

 Brock
 Brownville
 Johnson
 Julian
 Nemaha

Unincorporated communities
 Glenrock
 Howe
 Rohrs

Ghost town
 St. Deroin

Precincts
Nemaha County has the following precincts (which are similar to townships)

 Aspinwall
 Bedford
 Benton
 Brownville
 Douglas
 Glen Rock
 Lafayette
 London
 McKissick Island
 Nemaha
 Peru
 St. Deroin
 Washington

Politics
Nemaha County voters are reliably Republican. In only one national election since 1936 has the county selected the Democratic Party candidate. (With that being 1964)

See also
 National Register of Historic Places listings in Nemaha County, Nebraska
 Nemaha Half-Breed Reservation

External links
 Nemaha County Government (Official site)
 Nemaha County Tourism Website

References

 
Nebraska counties on the Missouri River
1855 establishments in Nebraska Territory
Populated places established in 1855